Jean Bassomben (born 11 April 1943) is a Cameroonian boxer. He competed in the men's heavyweight event at the 1972 Summer Olympics.

References

1943 births
Living people
Cameroonian male boxers
Olympic boxers of Cameroon
Boxers at the 1972 Summer Olympics
Place of birth missing (living people)
Heavyweight boxers
20th-century Cameroonian people